Saga is a British company focused on serving the needs of those aged 50 and over. It has 2.7 million customers. The company operates sites on the Kent and Sussex coast: Enbrook Park and Priory Square. It is listed on the London Stock Exchange.

History
The business was founded by Sidney De Haan in 1951 and was passed to his son Roger De Haan who took over in 1984 after his father's retirement. Saga was acquired by staff (20%) backed by the private equity firm Charterhouse in October 2004. Saga merged with The AA (owned by CVC and Permira) to form Acromas Holdings.

In July 2011, Saga acquired Allied Healthcare. On 31 January 2015, it wrote it down to zero, and then sold it, at a small net profit, to Aurelius Group in December 2015.

In May 2014, Saga Group Ltd was successfully listed on the London Stock Exchange as Saga PLC.

Also in 2014, Saga acquired Bolton based luxury holiday company, Destinology.

In January 2020, Saga appointed Euan Sutherland as CEO of the Saga Group. At the same time, Saga's escorted touring brand Titan Travel was put up for sale, but has subsequently been paused due to the ongoing impact of Coronavirus.

In February 2020, Saga sold its motorcycle insurance business, Bennetts, to Atlanta Investment Holdings Ltd, part of the Ardonagh group, for £26 million.

In March 2020, Saga sold its Patricia White's and Country Cousins domiciliary care agencies to private equity firm Limerston Capital for a reported £14 million.

In June 2020 Saga Care at Home permanently closed and its assets assigned to another care provider. This marked the end of Saga's involvement in the homecare sector.

Operations
Saga's operations include: Saga Holidays provides package holidays and tours across the globe. It owns and operates the cruise ships  and Spirit of Adventure as well as Titan Travel and luxury holiday company, Destinology.
 Saga Services provides a wide range of Insurance products, Motor, Home, Travel, Caravan, Commercial Van, Pet, Private Medical, Life Insurance, Motorhome.
 Saga Personal Finance provides savings accounts, credit cards, travel money, financial advice, equity release, share dealing, annuities, life assurance & long term care funding advice.
 Saga SOS Personal Alarms.
 Saga also owns direct mail and fulfilment service, Metro Mail.

Magazine
Saga operates a subscription magazine, Saga Magazine'', with a circulation of 627,000 and a readership of one million per month; it has been described as the "United Kingdom's biggest selling monthly subscription title". Founded by Paul Bach, under his editorship, it became Britain's biggest selling monthly magazine.

Television campaign
In 2021 Saga launched a new television campaign called Experience is Everything, featuring actor Nicholas Farrell.

Notes

References

Private providers of NHS services
Seniors' organizations
Travel insurance companies
Folkestone
Companies based in Kent
Financial services companies established in 1951
1951 establishments in England
Old age in the United Kingdom
2014 initial public offerings
Insurance companies of the United Kingdom
British companies established in 1951
Companies listed on the London Stock Exchange